Sloane is a surname. It is a variant to the Gaelic name Sloan. Notable people with the surname include:

 Barry Sloane (born 1981), English actor
 Charles A. Sloane (1850–1912), American farmer and politician
 George Benedict Sloane (1898–1958), American philatelist
 Hans Sloane (1660–1753), Irish physician and collector
 Harvey I. Sloane (born 1936), American physician and politician 
 Hugh Sloane (born 1956), British businessman 
 John Sloane (disambiguation)
 Lindsay Sloane (born 1977), American actress
 Neil Sloane (born 1939), British-American mathematician
 Rick Sloane (born 1961), American film director
 Thomas Gibson Sloane (1858–1932), Australian entomologist
 James "Tod" Sloane (1874–1933), American jockey
 William Milligan Sloane (1850–1928), American historian
 William Milligan Sloane III (1906–1974), American publisher and author

See also
 Sloane (disambiguation)
 Eric Sloane, pen name of American illustrator Everard Jean Hinrichs

Surnames of Irish origin
Scottish surnames
Surnames of Scottish origin
Anglicised Irish-language surnames